Fridrikh Markovich Ermler (born Vladimir Markovich Breslav; 13 May 1898 in Rēzekne – 12 July 1967 in Leningrad) was a Soviet film director, actor, and screenwriter.  He was a four-time recipient of the Stalin Prize (in 1941, twice in 1946, and in 1951).

After studying pharmacology, he joined the Czarist army in 1917 and soon took part in the October revolution on the side of the Bolshevists.  Captured and tortured by the White army, he only became a full party member at the end of the Civil War.

From 1923 to 1924 Ermler studied at the Cinema Academy. In 1932 he took part in creating one of the first Soviet talkies – the movie Vstrechny (The Counterplan). He also was one of the founders of the Creative Association KEM (together with  E. Ioganson). In 1929-1931 Ermler studied at the Communist Academy and wrote for the newspaper Kino. He also became the chairman of the Russian Association of Revolutionary Filmmakers.

In 1940 he became the director of the Lenfilm studio. Between 1941 and 1944, he worked at the Central United Film Studio of Feature Films (TsOKS) in Alma-Ata (now Kazakhfilm Film Studio). 

He died on July 12, 1967 in Komarovo. A memorial plaque was placed on the house in Leningrad where he lived from 1930 to 1962.

Filmography
 Scarlet Fever (Скарлатина) (1924); short
 Children of the Storm (Дети бури) (1926); co-directed with Eduard Ioganson
 Katka's Reinette Apples (Катька — Бумажный Ранет) (1926); co-directed with Eduard Ioganson
 The Parisian Cobbler (Парижский сапожник) (1927)
 The House in the Snow-Drifts (Дом в сугробах) (1928)
 Fragment of an Empire (Обломок империи) (1929)
 Counterplan (Встречный) (1932); co-directed with Sergei Yutkevich
 Peasants (Крестьяне) (1934)
 The Great Citizen (Великий гражданин) (1939)
 Balzac in Russia (Бальзак в России) (1940)
 Autumn (Осень) (1940); short, co-directed with Isaak Menaker
 She Defends the Motherland (Она защищает Родину), also released as No Greater Love (1943)
 The Turning Point (Великий перелом) (1945)
 The Great Force (Великая сила) (1949)
 Dinner Time (Званый ужин) (1953)
 Unfinished Story (Неоконченная повесть) (1955)
 The First Day (День первый) (1958)
 From New York to Yasnaya Poliana (Из Нью-Йорка в Ясную Поляну) (1963); documentary
 Facing the Judgment of History (Перед судом истории) (1965); documentary/interview with Vasily Shulgin

References

External links
 
 Encyclopedia of Russian Cinema
 Peter Bagrov in KinoKultura

1898 births
1967 deaths
People from Rēzekne
People from Rezhitsky Uyezd
Latvian Jews
Jews from the Russian Empire
Soviet Jews
Bolsheviks
Latvian people of World War I
Russian military personnel of World War I
Soviet military personnel of the Russian Civil War
Soviet male film actors
Soviet film directors
Soviet screenwriters
Male screenwriters
Silent film directors
People's Artists of the USSR
Stalin Prize winners
Directors of Palme d'Or winners
Burials at Bogoslovskoe Cemetery